"I Never Knew Love" is a song written by Larry Boone and Will Robinson, and recorded by American country music artist Doug Stone.  It was released in October 1993 as the lead-off single from his fourth album More Love.  It peaked at number 2 on the Billboard Hot Country Singles & Tracks chart and number 3 on the Canadian RPM Tracks chart.  The song was also Stone's only entry on the Billboard Hot 100, where it peaked at number 81.

Content
In this song, the narrator tells his lover about revelations in his life like that he didn't know the power of a song until his mother died, didn't know what innocence was until he saw a newborn baby, and didn't know what love was until he met her.

Chart performance

Year-end charts

References

1994 singles
1993 songs
Doug Stone songs
Songs written by Larry Boone
Song recordings produced by James Stroud
Epic Records singles
Songs written by Will Robinson (songwriter)